Genie Music, a subsidiary of KT Corporation, is a South Korean company that specializes in the production and distribution of music content. Its music streaming service is the second most used in South Korea with 2.5 million subscribers as of June 2018.

History

The company's history can be traced from the music contents division of Blue Cord Technology, established in 1991. The same division then owned Muz (now Olleh Music), one of the major music portals in the country. The division was also strengthened by the acquisition of Doremi Media (one of South Korea's well-known music publishers) in 2000.

In 2007, Blue Cord was acquired by KT Freetel, and upon merging with the former, made the music division a separate company named KTF Music. In 2009, the company was renamed as KT Music due to the merger of KTF and its parent KT Corporation.

It acquired KMP Holdings in 2012.

Following the investment of LG Uplus, the company changed its name to Genie Music in March 2017.

In October 2018, Genie Music and CJ ENM's CJ Digital Music merged, with Genie Music being the surviving entity and CJ ENM being the former's second largest shareholder with 15.35%.

Assets
 Genie (online music service)
 Shop&Genie  (music service for stores and other businesses)

Distribution Network

Present

Domestic
 143 Entertainment 
 Biscuit Entertainment 
 Blockberry Creative
 C9 Entertainment 
 High Up Entertainment
 KQ Entertainment
 MODHAUS
 Vine Entertainment
 Star Empire Entertainment 
 Signal Entertainment Group
 Stone Music Entertainment (digital format only; 2018–present)
 Wake One Entertainment 
 Hi-Lite Records 
 AOMG (with Kakao Entertainment)
 Amoeba Culture 
 SWING Entertainment 
 Off The Record Entertainment
 LM Entertainment
 Happy Face Entertainment (with Kakao Entertainment)
 HF Music Company
 Dreamcatcher Company
 D1CE Company
Music Factory Entertainment
 MTN ENTERTAINMENT (with Kakao Entertainment)

Foreign 

 Stone Music Entertainment (digital format only; 2018–present)
King Records 'You be Cool' division (AKB48)
ShowBT Entertainment Philippines Corp (2020–present)
SB19

Former

Domestic
 Astory Entertainment (2017–2019, now with NHN Bugs)
 J. Tune Camp (defunct)
 Jellyfish Entertainment (2017–2022, now with Kakao Entertainment)
 JYP Entertainment (until 2018, now with Dreamus Company) 
 Lion Media
 MBK Entertainment (2013–2014; now with Kakao Entertainment) 
 NH Media
 SM Entertainment (until 2018, now with Dreamus Company)
 Source Music (2010–2016; now with Kakao Entertainment and later on YG Plus)
 Stardom Entertainment (defunct)
 Starkim Entertainment
 WM Entertainment (2017–2021, now with Sony Music)
 YG Entertainment (until 2019, all releases now distributed by subsidiary YG Plus)
 YMC Entertainment

Foreign
 Avex Group (until 2018, now with Dreamus Company) 
 J Storm (until 2018, now with Dreamus Company)

References

External links
  

 
Companies listed on KOSDAQ
Record label distributors
South Korean record labels
Record labels established in 1991
1991 establishments in South Korea